The Deutscher Fußball-Verband der DDR (DFV) was from 1958 the football association of the (East) German Democratic Republic, fielding the East Germany national football team until 1990 before rejoining its counterpart, the German Football Association (DFB), which had been founded in 1900.

The DFV was dissolved on 20 November 1990 in Leipzig and in its place the North East German Football Association was formed and joined the German Football Association on the same day and at the same location, a few weeks after East Germany itself had ceased to exist with the German reunification on 3 October 1990.

Presidents and General secretaries

Presidents

General secretaries

See also
Football in East Germany

References

External links
 DFB website  
 NOFV website 

Football in East Germany
Football
2
Sports organizations established in 1958
Organizations disestablished in 1990
1958 establishments in East Germany
1990 disestablishments in Germany
East Germany